The presence of Cubans in Italy dates back after 1990s and most of them were married to Italian citizens.

Numbers
In 2014 in Italy there are 20,000 regular immigrants from Cuba. In 2006 there were 14,000. The three cities with most number of Cubans are: Rome, Milan and Turin.

Notable Cubans in Italy

 Mirka Francia (1975), volleyball player
 Magdelín Martínez (1976), triple jumper
 Ángel Dennis (1977), volleyball player
 Taismary Agüero (1977), volleyball player
 Osmany Juantorena (1985), volleyball player
 Frank Chamizo (1992),  Wrestling player
 Libania Grenot (1983),  athlete player
 Amaurys Pérez (1976),  water polo player

See also
 Dominican people in Italy
 Italians in Cuba

References

Caribbean diaspora in Italy
Ethnic groups in Italy
Cuban diaspora